The Transport functional constituency is a functional constituency in the elections for the Legislative Council of Hong Kong. 195 electors are only limited to 201 transport associations.

A similar Transport and Communication functional constituency was created for the 1995 election by Governor Chris Patten with a much larger electorate base of total 109,716 eligible voters.

Return members

Electoral results
Instant-runoff voting system is used from 1998 to 2021. Since 2021, first-past-the-post voting system is in use.

2020s

2010s

2000s

1990s

References

Constituencies of Hong Kong
Constituencies of Hong Kong Legislative Council
Functional constituencies (Hong Kong)
1998 establishments in Hong Kong
Constituencies established in 1998
Transport in Hong Kong